Integrin alpha-10 also known as ITGA10 is a protein that in humans is encoded by the ITGA10  gene.

Function
Integrins are integral membrane proteins composed of an alpha chain and a beta chain, and are known to participate in cell adhesion as well as cell-surface mediated signalling. The I-domain containing alpha 10 combines with the integrin beta 1 chain (ITGB1) to form a novel collagen type II-binding integrin expressed in cartilage tissue.

Related gene problems
TAR syndrome
1q21.1 deletion syndrome
1q21.1 duplication syndrome

References

Further reading

External links
ITGA10 Info with links in the Cell Migration Gateway 

Integrins